"Until the End of Time" is a song recorded by American singer-songwriter Justin Timberlake from his second studio album, FutureSex/LoveSounds (2006), written and produced by Timberlake, Timbaland, and Nate "Danja" Hills. The song was later re-recorded as a duet featuring American singer Beyoncé, which was released as a single on November 13, 2007 and included on the Deluxe Edition of the album. It reached the top 20 on the US Billboard Hot 100, being the sixth single from the album to do so, with Timberlake becoming the only male artist in the decade to achieve this. During the concert tour FutureSex/LoveShow, Timberlake performed the song as a piano solo.

Composition
"Until the End of Time" is a quiet storm ballad, R&B slow jam. The song utilizes Linn drums, which Ben Williams of New York compared to Prince's "The Beautiful Ones".

The digital download and vinyl editions of the album pair the track with a prelude titled "Set the Mood". The version on the standard edition does not feature the prelude, where it is instead attached to the end of the previous track, "Summer Love", as an interlude. The Beyoncé single also does not feature it.

Critical reception
In his review for Entertainment Weekly, Michael Slezak opined the single "sounds like another smash. The original flavor was already a treat —a stripped-down slow jam with a gorgeously simple melody." For Complex, Tannis Spencer wrote, "Justin and Beyonce got nice and comfy on this ballad and complement each from start to finish. The beat is slow with an accompanying string section that serves as the perfect backdrop for when Justin hits his high notes. The record has a sultry sound which helps offset the super futuristic sound on the rest of the album." Billboard editor Adelle Platon described it as a "dreamy love song." Quentin B. Huff of PopMatters wrote that "Until the End of Time" is heavily reminiscent of Prince's work, adding "both songs (with "Sexy Ladies") are album highlights, but they don't seem to strive for the same level of innovation as other songs in the set." Sputnikmusic's Amanda Murray called the song "excessively bland."

Chart performance
In the United States, the solo version of "Until the End of Time" entered the top 40 on the Billboard Hot 100 for the chart issued October 20, 2007, making him the first solo male artist that decade to spawn six top 40 singles from the same album. The previous male soloist to achieve that feat was Michael Jackson with Dangerous, which generated seven top 40 Hot 100 entries during 1991–1993. The previous album overall to do so was Shania Twain's Come On Over, which had six top 40 singles during 1997–1999. The same week, the song entered the top five on the Hot R&B/Hip-Hop Songs chart.

Eventually, the duet version became Timberlake's 17th and Beyoncé's 21st career top 20 song on the Hot 100. The song also became the sixth US top 20 entry from the album and Timberlake became the first to do that since Michael Jackson in 1991.

It also became Beyoncé's highest charting single on US Adult R&B radio peaking at number 2, until "Love On Top" in 2012.

Formats and track listings
Digital download (3-track)
 "Until the End of Time" – 5:22
 "Summer Love" (Main Version – Clean) – 4:12
 "LoveStoned/I Think She Knows" (Justice Remix) – 4:43

Remixes EP
 "Until the End of Time" (Jason Nevins Extended Mix) – 7:20
 "Until the End of Time" (Jason Nevins Mixshow) – 5:42
 "Until the End of Time" (Ralphi Rosario BIG Radio Mix) – 3:53
 "Until the End of Time" (Johnny Vicious and DJ Escape Remix) – 8:35
 "Until the End of Time" (Mike Rizzo Global Club Mix) – 7:30
 "Until the End of Time" (Jonathan Peters Club Mix) – 8:50

Credits and personnel
Credits adapted from FutureSex/LoveSounds booklet:

Jimmy Douglass – mixer, recorder
Kaliq Glover – strings recorder
Dave Hampton – technical director
Lisa Hampton – Pro Tools engineer
Danja – drums, keys producer, writer
Beyoncé – additional vocals
Timbaland – drums, keys, producer, recorder, writer
Justin Timberlake – background vocals, producer, writer
Ethan Willoughby – additional Pro Tools engineer
Benjamin Wright – conductor, strings arrangement
The Benjamin Wright Orchestra:
Richard Adkins – violin
Peggy Baldwin – viola
Brian Benning – violin
Charlie Bisharat – violin
Ida Bodin – bass
Kevin Brandon – bass
Mark Cargill – concertmaster, contractor, violin
Susan Chatman – violin

Phillippa "Pip" Clarke – violin
Jeff Clayton – flute
Salvator Cracchiolo – trumpet
Yvette Devereaux – violin
Ernie Ehrhardt – viola
James Ford – trumpet
Pam Gates – violin
Songa Lee-Kitto – violin
Valerie King – flute
Marisa McLeod – violin
Giovana Moraga – viola
Partick Morgan – viola
Michele Nardonecelli – viola
Cameron Patrick – viola
Kathleen Robertson – violin
Jimbo Ross – viola
Nancy Stein-Ross – viola
Mari Tsumura – violin

Charts

Weekly charts

Year-end charts

Decade-end charts

Certifications

Release history

Notes

References

External links
 

2006 songs
2007 singles
Beyoncé songs
Justin Timberlake songs
Male–female vocal duets
Pop ballads
Song recordings produced by Danja (record producer)
Song recordings produced by Timbaland
Song recordings produced by Justin Timberlake
Music videos directed by Marty Callner
Songs written by Justin Timberlake
Songs written by Timbaland
Songs written by Danja (record producer)
Jive Records singles
Quiet storm songs
Contemporary R&B ballads
2000s ballads

de:Until the End of Time
pt:Until the End of Time
ru:Until the End of Time (сингл)